Focus is a jazz album recorded in 1961, featuring Stan Getz on tenor saxophone with a string orchestra. The album is a suite which was originally commissioned by Getz from composer and arranger Eddie Sauter. Widely regarded as a high point in both men's careers, Getz later described Focus as his favorite among his own records. The pair would next collaborate on their soundtrack to the 1965 film Mickey One.

Description
As noted in the booklet for the 1997 CD reissue, Sauter's orchestration did not include melodies for Getz. Rather, Sauter left spaces in the arrangements in which Getz would improvise. Documentation for the recording dates is incomplete, but the CD booklet reports that those involved in the original sessions recall that Getz recorded live with the strings on about half the songs, while he overdubbed sax solos on the others.

The theme of the opening track, "I'm Late, I'm Late", is nearly identical to the opening minutes of the second movement of Béla Bartók's Music for Strings, Percussion and Celesta. Bartók had been an early supporter of Sauter, who intended the track as an homage. "I'm Late, I'm Late" also features drummer Roy Haynes, the album's only soloist beside Getz.

The Penguin Guide to Jazz selected this album as part of its suggested "Core Collection" stating "Nobody ever arranged for Getz as well as this, and Sauter's luminous and shimmering scores continue to bewitch". Similarly, critic Stephen Cook describes Focus as "admittedly Getz's most challenging date and arguably his finest moment".

Track listing
All compositions by Eddie Sauter.

"I'm Late, I'm Late" – 8:10
"Her" – 6:13
"Pan" – 3:58
"I Remember When" – 5:03
"Night Rider" – 3:58
"Once Upon a Time" – 4:48
"A Summer Afternoon" – 6:03
"I'm Late, I'm Late" [45 rpm issue] – 2:31 Bonus track on CD reissue
"I Remember When" [45 rpm issue] – 2:57 Bonus track on CD reissue

Personnel
 Stan Getz – tenor saxophone
 Steve Kuhn – piano
 John Neves – bass
 Roy Haynes – drums
 Alan Martin, Norman Carr, Gerald Tarack – violin
 Jacob Glick – viola
 Bruce Rogers – cello
 Eddie Sauter – arranger
 Hershy Kay – conductor
Technical
Pete Turner – photography

References

External links 
 FreeCDDB entry
 Complete Published Score

1962 albums
Stan Getz albums
Albums produced by Creed Taylor
Verve Records albums
Albums conducted by Hershy Kay
Albums arranged by Eddie Sauter